Bishopslea Preparatory School for Girls (or Bishopslea) is an all-female independent, preparatory, boarding and day school in Harare, Zimbabwe. The school was founded in 1932 as Bishop's Lea, St Mary's Diocesan Preparatory School by the Rt. Rev. Edward Paget at the grounds of the Anglican Cathedral in Harare.

Bishopslea Preparatory School is a member of the Association of Trust Schools (ATS) and the Head is a member of the Conference of Heads of Independent Schools in Zimbabwe (CHISZ).

Sport
The following sporting disciplines are offered at Bishopslea: athletics, hockey, netball, swimming and tennis.

Houses
Bishopslea has a house system consisting of four houses which are Beaven, Gaul, Knight-Bruce, Paget. The houses and the house colour are
 Knight-Bruce—Yellow
 Gaul—Green
 Beaven—Red
 Paget—Purple
The houses are named after Bishops Frederic Beaven, William Gaul, George Knight-Bruce and Edward Paget.

Notable alumnae
 Elana Hill - Zimbabwean rower

See also

 List of schools in Zimbabwe

References

External links
 
 Bishopslea Preparatory School Profile on the ATS website

Schools in Harare
Private schools in Zimbabwe
Girls' schools in Zimbabwe
Anglican schools in Zimbabwe
Day schools in Zimbabwe
Boarding schools in Zimbabwe
Educational institutions established in 1932
Member schools of the Association of Trust Schools
1932 establishments in the British Empire